Stefan Georgiev Trendafilov (born March 4, 1971, in Sliven) is a retired boxer from Bulgaria, who competed for his native country at the 1992 Summer Olympics in Barcelona, Spain. There he was defeated in the quarterfinals of the Men's Middleweight (– 75 kg) by Canada's eventual bronze medalist Chris Johnson.

References
 sports-reference

1971 births
Living people
Middleweight boxers
Olympic boxers of Bulgaria
Boxers at the 1992 Summer Olympics
Bulgarian male boxers
Sportspeople from Sliven